The Way of the Wiseguy, by Joseph D. Pistone (Running Press), is a non-fiction description of Mafia personalities and culture, published in 2004. The author, Joseph D. Pistone, spent six years undercover for the FBI infiltrating New York organized crime.

Synopsis
The book records psychological portraits of the personalities Pistone associated with during his years undercover. Among the many recurring themes in the book: wiseguys are not nice people, they don't have friends (not even people they have known and worked with their whole life), and they will beat or kill you without hesitation.

Pistone relays experiences with international organized crime, as a consultant and undercover agent for Scotland Yard, and infiltrating a drug lord's operation in a foreign country.

An audio CD is included with the book, containing actual FBI surveillance recordings of Pistone, working undercover as Donnie Brasco, and the mobster who taught him about the Mafia.

2004 non-fiction books
Non-fiction books about Italian-American organized crime
Bonanno crime family
Running Press books
Works about the American Mafia